The San Felipe Pueblo (Eastern Keres: Katishtya) is the homeland of a branch of the Native American Pueblo people. It lies in Sandoval County, New Mexico, United States, just north of the city of Albuquerque. It has a land area of 205.852 km² (79.48 sq mi), and reported a resident population of 3,686 persons as of the 2020 census. It two largest communities are San Felipe Pueblo and Algodones.

References
San Felipe Pueblo, New Mexico United States Census Bureau

External links

San Felipe Pueblo

Native American tribes in New Mexico